Disputanta may refer to:

Disputanta, Kentucky, an unincorporated community located in Rockcastle County
Disputanta, Virginia, an unincorporated community in Prince George County